New Jersey is a U.S. state.

New Jersey may also refer to:

 Province of New Jersey, before independence in 1776
 New Jersey (album), a 1988 album by Bon Jovi
 USS New Jersey (BB-16), a battleship commissioned in 1906
 USS New Jersey (BB-62), a battleship commissioned in 1943, now a museum ship in Camden, New Jersey
 USS New Jersey (SSN-796), a Block IV Virginia-class submarine ordered from General Dynamics.
 College of New Jersey, a public university in Ewing, New Jersey

Sports
New Jersey Lions, the athletic teams of the College of New Jersey
New Jersey Devils, members of the Metropolitan Division of the Eastern Conference of the National Hockey League (NHL) (1982)

See also